Utricularia circumvoluta is a medium-sized, probably annual, carnivorous plant that belongs to the genus Utricularia. It is endemic to the Northern Territory and Queensland, Australia. U. circumvoluta grows as a terrestrial plant in swamps and near streams or lagoons, usually in shallow water in the company of tall grasses and sedges, which its inflorescence twines up. It was originally described and published by Peter Taylor in 1986. It somewhat resembles U. scandens, which it had been confused for in the past.

See also 
 List of Utricularia species

References 

Carnivorous plants of Australia
Flora of Queensland
Flora of the Northern Territory
circumvoluta
Lamiales of Australia